Giacomo Manzoni (1840–1912) was an Italian painter, active and exhibiting in the Veneto, mainly genre works.

Biography
He was born in Padua. He painted still lives, exhibited at Turin in 1880. At Milan in 1881 he exhibited Frutta; Un' erbivendola; La leggitrice; La pittrice; and Una fanciulla. At Rome, in 1883, he exhibited Fra due fuochi; Head of vecchio, and other still-lives with fruit. At Turin, in 1884: Donne; Head of popolano, and Flowers. To Venice, in 1887, Pro pudor.

There are two other artists named Giacomo Manzoni, a composer of same name born in 1932. In addition, Giacomo Manzù, born December 22, 1908, and died January 17, 1991. His artistic name was Giacomo Manzoni.

References

External links
 Il pittore padovano Giacomo Manzoni, 1840-1912, by Luigi Rizzoli. 1915.

1840 births
1912 deaths
19th-century Italian painters
Italian male painters
20th-century Italian painters
Painters from Padua
Italian genre painters
19th-century Italian male artists
20th-century Italian male artists